Oeciacus vicarius, known generally as the American swallow bug or cliff swallow bug, is a species of bed bug in the family Cimicidae. It is found in North America. The bug is a blood-feeding ectoparasite of the colonially nesting American cliff swallow (Petrochelidon pyrrhonota) and vector of Buggy Creek Virus (family Togaviridae, genus Alphavirus).

References

Further reading

 
 

Cimicidae
Hemiptera of North America
Insects described in 1912
Taxa named by Géza Horváth
Articles created by Qbugbot